Shuji Kobayashi (born 17 April 1939) is a Japanese speed skater. He competed in three events at the 1960 Winter Olympics.

References

1939 births
Living people
Japanese male speed skaters
Olympic speed skaters of Japan
Speed skaters at the 1960 Winter Olympics
Sportspeople from Nagano Prefecture
20th-century Japanese people